Sarangay is a creature resembling a minotaur with a jewel or gemstone attached to its ears. When the Spanish first heard the story in the 17th century, they thought the legends described the Greek minotaur. Sarangay is described as half bull (specifically, a male water buffalo) and half man.

According to folklore, the creatures guard their jewels and attempted thieves will be killed mercilessly. It was said that when a Sarangay becomes enraged, smoke issues from its nostrils.

In popular culture
 In the mobile game EverWing, Sarangay is an unlockable creature.

References

Visayan mythology
Philippine demons